Mr. Pastry's Progress is a British comedy television series which originally aired on the BBC from 1950 to 1951. Richard Hearne appeared as his character Mr. Pastry. The original series featured fifteen minute episodes, which was broadcast live. It later returned for a 1962 series of the same title. It lasted for six episodes, and co-starred Barbara Hicks.

Cast
 Richard Hearne as Mr. Pastry
 Barbara Hicks as Miss Print 
 Cambria Smith as Susan
 Roger May as  Michael

References

Bibliography
 Vahimagi, Tise . British Television: An Illustrated Guide. Oxford University Press, 1996.

External links
 

1950 British television series debuts
1951 British television series endings
1962 British television series debuts
1962 British television series endings
1960s British comedy television series
BBC television sitcoms
English-language television shows